Connecticut's 14th House of Representatives district elects one member of the Connecticut House of Representatives. It encompasses part of the town of South Windsor. It has been represented by Republican Tom Delnicki since 2017.

Recent elections

2020

2018

2016

2014

2012

References

14